Out To Die is the fifth studio album by the Norwegian black/thrash metal band Aura Noir. Artwork, Cover, Layout by Chioreanu Costin.

Track listing

Personnel
Apollyon − drums, bass, vocals
Aggressor − vocals, guitar
Blasphemer − lead guitar

References

Aura Noir albums
2012 albums